Sara Bates (born 1944) is an American mixed media artist and member of the Cherokee Nation.

Biography
Sara Bates was born in Muskogee, Oklahoma in 1944. In 1987, she graduated from California State University, Bakersfield with a Bachelor of Arts degree in Fine Art and Women's Studies. In 1989, she graduated from the University of California (Master of Fine Arts degree in Sculpture and Painting/Intermedia).

From 1990 to 1995, she served as the curator for American Indian Contemporary Arts (AICA) organization located in Piedmont, California. In 1997, Bates served as an instructor at San Francisco State University, and the following year, she taught at Florida State University as a visiting professor of art.

Artistic style

Bates is known for her mixed media mandala and medicine wheel designs. She makes these out of various plant products, like pine cones, seeds, leaves, and flowers. According to Phoebe Farris, these designs "are usually laid on the floor in an 8- to 12-foot circular designs, with the center in an equal-arm cross, the arms oriented toward the four cardinal directions."

References

Bibliography
 
 

1944 births
Living people
Cherokee Nation artists
Native American women artists
Cherokee artists
People from Muskogee, Oklahoma
Artists from Oklahoma
California State University, Bakersfield alumni
University of California alumni
20th-century American artists
20th-century American women artists
21st-century American artists
21st-century American women artists
20th-century Native Americans
21st-century Native Americans
20th-century Native American women
21st-century Native American women